Panique (1881-1895) was an American Thoroughbred racehorse best known for winning the 1884 Belmont Stakes.

Background

Panique was bred at Erdenheim Stud Farm in Pennsylvania by Aristides Welch. His dam was Maggie B. B., a daughter of leading sire Australian who had already given birth to two stakes winners. His sire was Alarm.

Racing career

As a two-year-old, Panique won the Saratoga Stakes, and came second in the Kentucky Stakes. As a three-year-old, he won the Withers Stakes. The Dwyer Brothers, Philip J. Dwyer and Michael F. Dwyer, were so impressed by the colt's victory that they purchased him from his previous owner, Commodore Kitteon, on June 5, the night before the Belmont, for $14,000. The following day, Panique went into the Belmont the favorite. Another strong competitor in the race, Knight of Ellersie, had been off his feed and coughing in the days before the race. Panique ended up winning the race, beating out Knight of Ellersie by a neck. The race was called "the grandest Belmont ever run".

After his victory in the Belmont, Panique did not show the same skill he had previously. He came third in the Kenner Stakes, but was known as an inconsistent horse. He was later sold for a much smaller sum than the Dwyers had originally paid for him.

Later life

In 1885, Panique broke down during a race, ending his racing career. He started to become better known for his aggressive behavior than his prior accomplishments in racing. At some point, he ended up in the hands of Oscar Rudolph Gleason, a renowned horse trainer who specialized in dealing with particularly unruly horses. Gleason agreed with the assessment that Panique was "the worst stallion ever handled in the city of New York".

Panique died in the spring of 1895.

Pedigree

References

1881 racehorse births
Racehorses bred in Pennsylvania
Racehorses trained in the United States
Belmont Stakes winners
1895 racehorse deaths